Jennifer or Jenny Archer may refer to:

People
Jennifer Archer (born 1957), American romantic fiction writer
Jennifer Archer, Barbadian high jumper who took a bronze medal in the 1982 Central American and Caribbean Junior Championships in Athletics
Jenny Archer (coach), British para-athletics coach

Fictional characters
Jenny Archer (book series), a series of book by Ellen Conford
Jenny Archer, character in The Age of Innocence 1993 film
Jennifer Aldridge née Archer, character in the BBC radio soap opera The Archers